Boscacci is an Italian surname. Notable people with the surname include:

 Graziano Boscacci (born 1969), Italian ski mountaineer
 Leticia Boscacci (born 1985), Argentine volleyball player 
 Michele Boscacci (born 1990), Italian ski mountaineer, son of Graziano